The Karnofsky Tailor Shop–House (also known as the Karnofsky Shop) was a historic, two-story building in the Central Business District of New Orleans, Louisiana, that played a significant role in the early promotion of jazz when the neighborhood was known as "Back of Town". It was destroyed by Hurricane Ida in 2021.

History 
The building was built around 1910. The Karnofsky family lived upstairs and owned a secondhand store and later a tailor shop on the first floor. The Karnofskys took in a young Louis Armstrong, gave him a job, and encouraged him to become a musician. Later, Morris Karnofsky, Armstrong's boyhood friend, opened Morris Music, the city's first jazz record store. Armstrong moved away in 1921 but continued to visit the shop.

Model Tailors moved into the building after the Karnofskys moved out. The building sat abandoned for years, while several plans to restore the building and surrounding neighborhood were unsuccessful. On October 16, 2002, the building was listed on the National Register of Historic Places. As of 2019, it was slated to be restored, possibly for conversion into a nightclub. However, it collapsed on August 29, 2021, when Hurricane Ida swept through the city as a category 4 storm.

See also 

 National Register of Historic Places listings in Orleans Parish, Louisiana

References 

Downtown New Orleans
Louis Armstrong
National Register of Historic Places in New Orleans
1910 establishments in Louisiana
Buildings and structures completed in 1910
2021 disestablishments in Louisiana
Buildings and structures demolished in 2021
Former buildings and structures in Louisiana